Angraecinae is a subtribe in the family Orchidaceae. The subtribe consists of approximately 47 genera. The type genus is Angraecum. Most of the genera are endemic to Africa, Madagascar and other Indian Ocean Islands, a few genera can also be found in the Americas.

Taxonomy 
Recent scholarship has led to proposed reorganization of this subtribe.  The proposed change would have Campylocentrum and all leafless Neotropical genera transferred to a new subtribe under tribe Vandeae to be called Campylocentrinae.  That would leave only the Palaeotropical genera in the Angraecum alliance within this subtribe. There is, however, not sufficient scientific agreement to justify moving the "Campylocentrinae" at this time.

Angraecum Alliance
Aeranthes Lindl., 1824 (47 spp.)
Ambrella H. Perrier., 1934 (1 sp.)
Angraecum Bory, 1804 (219 spp.)
Calyptrochilum Kraenzl. (2 spp.)
Cryptopus Lindl. (4 spp.)
Jumellea Schltr., 1914 (58 spp.)
Lemurella Schltr., 1925 (4 spp.)
Lemurorchis Kraenzl., 1893 (1 sp.)
Neobathiea Schltr., 1925 (5 spp.)
Oeonia Lindl., 1826 (6 spp.)
Oeoniella Schltr., 1918 (2 spp.)
Podangis  Schltr., 1918 (2 spp.)
Sobennikoffia Schltr., 1925 (4 spp.)

Campylocentrum Alliance
Campylocentrum Lindl., 1835 (73 spp.)
Dendrophylax Rchb.f. (9 spp.)

Phylogeny 
The subtribe Angraecinae (incl. Aerangidinae) is the sister group to the subtribe Aeridinae:

Genera

Aerangis
Aeranthes Lindl., 1824 (47 spp.)
Ambrella H. Perrier., 1934 (1 sp.)
Ancistrorhynchus
Angraecopsis
Angraecum Bory, 1804 (219 spp.)
Beclardia
Bolusiella
Calyptrochilum Kraenzl. (2 spp.)
Campylocentrum Lindl., 1835 (73 spp.)
Cardiochilos
Chauliodon
Cribbia
Cryptopus Lindl. (4 spp.)
Cyrtorchis
Dendrophylax Rchb.f. (9 spp.)
Diaphananthe
Dinklageella
Eggelingia
Erasanthe
Eurychone
Jumellea Schltr., 1914 (58 spp.)
Lemurella Schltr., 1925 (4 spp.)
Lemurorchis Kraenzl., 1893 (1 sp.)
Listrostachys
Margelliantha
Microcoelia
Mystacidium
Neobathiea Schltr., 1925 (5 spp.)
Nephrangis
Oeonia Lindl., 1826 (6 spp.)
Oeoniella Schltr., 1918 (2 spp.)
Ossiculum P.J.Cribb & Laan, 1986 (1 sp.)
Plectrelminthus
Podangis  Schltr., 1918 (1 sp.)
Rangaeris
Rhaesteria
Rhipidoglossum
Sobennikoffia Schltr., 1925 (4 spp.)
Solenangis
Sphyrarhynchus
Summerhayesia
Taeniorrhiza
Triceratorhynchus
Tridactyle
Ypsilopus

Some species

References 

 

 
Orchid subtribes